The Bayóvar mine is a large mine in the Sechura desert in the Piura Region of Peru. Annual production can reach  of phosphate concentrate at a minimum grade of 29% P2O5.

See also 
 List of mines in Peru
 Zinc mining

References 

Phosphate mines in Peru